Platycampus is a genus of sawflies belonging to the family Tenthredinidae.

The species of this genus are found in Europe, Easternmost Asia and Northern America.

Species:
 Platycampus amurensis
 Platycampus itascus Rohwer & Middleton

References

Tenthredinidae
Sawfly genera